Christine Platt (born c. 1953) is the past president of the Commonwealth Association of Planners and past president of the South African Planning Institute. Platt completed her B.A. (Economics) at the University of Natal, Durban, in 1976, and her MTRP (UND) in 1979.

References 

South African urban planners
1950s births
Living people